Santiago Abréu (died 8 August 1837) was governor of Santa Fe de Nuevo México (New Mexico) from 1832 to 1833.
He was a victim of the Chimayó Rebellion of 1837. 
He was dismembered before being allowed to die.

Santiago Abreú was deputy to the Congress in Mexico City from 1825 to 1826, and was appointed governor in 1832–33.

Abréu was a supporter of Governor Albino Pérez, who had become extremely unpopular for enforcing the decisions of the centrist government of President Antonio López de Santa Anna, which included reduction of local political control and imposition of new taxes.
During the rebellion against Pérez which broke out on 7 August 1837, Abréu was captured near the rancho of Cerrillos and imprisoned in Santo Domingo.
The next day he was taken from jail by a mob that tore off his penis and decapitated him.
His brother Ramón Abréu, publisher of the newspaper El Crepúsculo de la Libertad, was also assassinated in this rebellion.
The assassins were Pueblo warriors from Santo Domingo, who were also responsible for the death of governor Pérez.
However, in the aftermath of the rebellion they were treated carefully to avoid further trouble.

References

1837 deaths
Governors of New Mexico
Assassinated Mexican politicians
People murdered in New Mexico
Mexican governors of Santa Fe de Nuevo México
Year of birth missing